Gheorghe Vasilescu (26 February 1935 – 1993) was a Romanian sports shooter. He competed in the men's 50 metre rifle, prone event at the 1976 Summer Olympics.

References

1935 births
1993 deaths
Romanian male sport shooters
Olympic shooters of Romania
Shooters at the 1976 Summer Olympics
Sportspeople from Bucharest